Leonid Aleksandrovich Shamkovich (Russian: Леони́д Алекса́ндрович Шамко́вич; June 1, 1923 – April 22, 2005) was a chess Grandmaster and chess writer.

He was born in a Jewish family in Rostov-on-Don in Russia.

Chess career
Shamkovich became a Grandmaster in 1965 and won several tournaments, with his best victory coming at Sochi in 1967, where he tied for first place with Nikolai Krogius, Vladimir Simagin, Boris Spassky and Alexander Zaitsev. Other notable results included a tie for 3rd at the 1962 Moscow Championship (behind Yuri Averbakh and Evgeny Vasiukov) and finishing third at Mariánské Lázně 1965 (behind Paul Keres and Vlastimil Hort).

Shamkovich left the Soviet Union in 1975, moving first to Israel, then Canada, and finally the United States, where he lived the remainder of his life. He won the 1975 Canadian Open Chess Championship. He continued to play through the 1990s, and wrote several chess books.

His Sacrifice in Chess begins: "A real sacrifice involves a radical change in the character of a game which cannot be effected without foresight, fantasy, and the willingness to risk."

Personal life
His aristocratic bearing and manner of speech earned him the nickname "Prince".

Shamkovich died of complications from Parkinson's disease and cancer in his Brooklyn home on April 22, 2005.

Books
 Caro–Kann 4 ...Nd7, Leonid Shamkovich & Eric Schiller, Chess Enterprises, 1987. .
 Chess Sacrifices, Leonid Shamkovich & A. Kalajs (Translator), Chess Player, 1976. .
 The Chess Terrorist's Handbook, Leonid Shamkovich & Paul Hodges (Editor), American Chess Promotions, 1995. .
 Fischer–Spassky 1992: World Chess Championship Rematch, Leonid Shamkovich, Jan R. Cartier & Lou Hays (Editor), Hays Publishing, 1993. .
 The Gruenfeld Defense, Leonid Shamkovich & Jan R. Cartier, Hays Publishing, 1997. .
 Karpov–Kasparov 1990: An Expert Analysis, Don Maddox, Ron Henley & Leonid Shamkovich (Contributor), Three Rivers Press, 1991. .
 Kasparov's Opening Repertoire, Leonid Shamkovich & Eric Schiller, B.T. Batsford, 1995. .
 Killer Chess Tactics: World Champion Tactics and Combinations, Raymond Keene, Eric Schiller & Leonid Shamkovich, Cardoza Publishing, 2003 (2nd Edition). .
 The Modern Chess Sacrifice, Leonid Shamkovich, David McKay Company, 1978 (2nd Edition). .
 A New Era, Michael Khodarkovsky, Leonid Shamkovich & Garry Kasparov (Foreword by), Ballantine Books, 1997. .
 Play The Tarrasch, Leonid Shamkovich & Eric Schiller, Pergamon Press, 1984. .
 Sacrifice in Chess, Leonid Shamkovich, Alfred Kalnajs & Son, 1972. .
 Saving Lost Positions, Leonid Shamkovich & Eric Schiller, B.T. Batsford, 1987. .
 Saving Lost Positions, Leonid Shamkovich & Eric Schiller, Ishi Press, revised in 2011. .
 Schliemann Defense, Eric Schiller & Leonid Shamkovich,‎ Ishi Press, 2012. .
 The Schliemann Defense • Volume 1 Tartakower Variation: 5...Nf6, Leonid Shamkovich & Eric Schiller, Chess Enterprises, 1993. .
 The Schliemann Defense • Volume 2 Classical Variation, Leonid Shamkovich & Eric Schiller, Chess Enterprises, 1996. .
 Spanish Gambits, Leonid Shamkovich & Eric Schiller, B.T. B.T. Batsford, 1986. .
 Spanish Gambits, Leonid Shamkovich & Eric Schiller, Ishi Press, updated in 2011. .
 Spanish: Schliemann (Jaenisch), Leonid Shamkovich & Eric Schiller, B.T. Batsford, 1983. .
 Tactical Chess Training, Leonid Shamkovich & Jan R. Cartier, Hays Publishing, 1996. .
 The Tactical World Of Chess, Leonid Shamkovich, Three Rivers Press, 1981. .
 World Champion Tactics, Leonid Shamkovich & Eric Schiller, Cardoza Publishing, 1999. .

See also
 List of Jewish chess players

References

External links
 

1923 births
2005 deaths
Chess grandmasters
Chess theoreticians
Soviet chess players
Jewish chess players
Soviet Jews
Deaths from Parkinson's disease
Soviet chess writers
Deaths from cancer in New York (state)
Neurological disease deaths in New York (state)
Sportspeople from Rostov-on-Don
Soviet expatriate sportspeople in Israel
Soviet expatriate sportspeople in the United States
Soviet expatriate sportspeople in Canada
Soviet emigrants to the United States